The 2017 FIVB Volleyball Men's World Grand Champions Cup was the 7th staging of the FIVB Volleyball World Grand Champions Cup, a quadrennial international men's volleyball tournament organized by the Fédération Internationale de Volleyball (FIVB). The tournament was held in Nagoya and Osaka, Japan from 12 to 17 September 2017. 6 national teams from 5 confederations competed in the tournament.

Brazil claimed their fourth straight Grand Champions Cup title and fifth overall. Italy and Iran won the silver and the bronze medal respectively. This was Iran's first ever medal at a worldwide-level FIVB tournament. Ricardo Lucarelli from Brazil was elected the MVP.

Qualification
FIVB announced the four best ranked continents in the 2016 Olympic Games were eligible to participate in the tournament. South America, Europe, North America, and Asia confederations were eligible to send representatives. The representatives were determined by their continental rankings at the Olympic tournament. The four teams will join the host team and a wild card team which to compete for the World Grand Champions Cup title.

Qualified teams

Competition formula
The competition formula of the 2017 Men's World Grand Champions Cup was a single Round-Robin system. Each team plays against each of the five remaining teams. Points were accumulated during the whole tournament, and the final standing was determined by the total points gained.

Squads

Venues

Pool standing procedure
 Number of matches won
 Match points
 Sets ratio
 Points ratio
 If the tie continues as per the point ratio between two teams, the priority will be given to the team which won the last match between them. When the tie in points ratio is between three or more teams, a new classification of these teams in the terms of points 1, 2 and 3 will be made taking into consideration only the matches in which they were opposed to each other.

Match won 3–0 or 3–1: 3 match points for the winner, 0 match points for the loser
Match won 3–2: 2 match points for the winner, 1 match point for the loser

Results
All times are Japan Standard Time (UTC+09:00).

|}

Nagoya round

|}

Osaka round

|}

Final standing

Awards

Most Valuable Player
 Ricardo Lucarelli
Best Setter
 Simone Giannelli
Best Outside Spikers
 Ricardo Lucarelli
 Milad Ebadipour

Best Middle Blockers
 Matteo Piano
 Lucas Saatkamp
Best Opposite Spiker
 Matt Anderson
Best Libero
 Satoshi Ide

See also
2017 FIVB Volleyball Women's World Grand Champions Cup

References

External links
Official website

FIVB Volleyball Men's World Grand Champions Cup
FIVB Volleyball Men's World Grand Champions Cup
FIVB Volleyball Men's World Grand Champions Cup
International volleyball competitions hosted by Japan
September 2017 sports events in Asia